School for Higher and Professional Education (SHAPE) is a post-secondary educational institution in Hong Kong which offers "top-up" degree programmes to holders of higher diplomas to allow them to receive a bachelor's degree. The School is a constituent of the Vocational Training Council (VTC). It was established in 2003 as a collaborative effort of the VTC and a number of overseas institutions. SHAPE offers programmes in finance, applied science, business and management, information technology, design, engineering, and hospitality.

SHAPE has campuses in Chai Wan, Tsing Yi, Sha Tin, Wanchai, Kwun Tong, Tseung Kwan O, and Tuen Mun.

Partner Institutions
Degrees from SHAPE are developed and awarded in collaboration with the following institutions:

References

2003 establishments in Hong Kong
Educational institutions established in 2003
Universities and colleges in Hong Kong